Ted McCord may refer to:

Ted McCord (cinematographer) (1900–1976), American director of photography
Ted McCord (musician) (born 1907), American jazz clarinetist and saxophonist

See also
McCord (surname)